Christian Bubalović (born 9 August 1991) is an Austrian professional footballer who plays as a centre-back for Floridsdorfer AC. He holds both the Austrian and Croatian citizenship.

References

External links
PrvaLiga profile 

1991 births
Living people
Austrian people of Croatian descent
Austrian footballers
Association football defenders
Austrian expatriate footballers
SV Wienerberger players
SK Rapid Wien players
1. Simmeringer SC players
FC Admira Wacker Mödling players
FC Energie Cottbus players
NK Rudar Velenje players
Kapfenberger SV players
Birkirkara F.C. players
Floridsdorfer AC players
Slovenian PrvaLiga players
2. Liga (Austria) players
Austrian expatriate sportspeople in Germany
Austrian expatriate sportspeople in Slovenia
Austrian expatriate sportspeople in Malta
Expatriate footballers in Germany
Expatriate footballers in Slovenia
Expatriate footballers in Malta